Mermaids, like many other creatures of mythology and folklore, are regularly depicted in literature, film, music, and popular culture. In the folklore of some modern cultures, the concept of the siren has been assimilated to that of the mermaid. For example, the French word for mermaid is sirène, Italian sirena, and similarly in certain other European languages. This usage existed by the Middle Ages.

Literature

Comic books
07-Ghost - The mermaid Lazette sings and plays an organ in a church. She can shapeshift her face into that of other people. If people eat her scales it allows them to breathe underwater.
Aion - This manga has several mermaids. One of them is named Sheila, The youngest of the mermaids. She falls in love with the main character, Tatsuya.
Akazukin Chacha - In this manga, a mermaid named Marin falls in love with Riiya. She can change into a human when her tail dries out.
Arabelle the Last Mermaid by Jean Ache appeared as a comic strip in the daily French newspaper France-Soir between 1950 and 1962. The character returned in various magazines until 1972. Arabelle is discovered by an American plastic surgeon on a Mediterranean island.  The surgeon gives her human legs, but she retains her ability to breathe underwater. With her companion, a reformed burglar, Arabelle becomes involved in a series of light, romantic adventures. 
In the manga Black Cat, one of the main characters, Eve, uses nanomachines to give herself transformation abilities, and once she transforms into a mermaid.
Dragon Ball - In chapter 25, "A Rival Arrives!!", Master Roshi asks Goku to bring him a pretty girl, and if he did, he would train him. Goku finds a mermaid and Master Roshi tries to hit on her. She just slaps him and jumps back into the ocean.
In the manga/anime Fairy Tail, the main female protagonist, Lucy Heartfilia, uses celestial spirits, one of which is a mermaid called Aquarius. Also, another character, Lisanna Strauss, uses animal-based transformations, one of her tricks being to turn into a mermaid (in an anime-only episode). Furthermore, in the final arc, Lucy and another character, Brandish Mu, are temporarily turned into mermaids when Aquarius takes them to the Memory of the Stars to show them the truth about their mothers.
Legendz - In the manga, Ken Kazaki's friend Ririko Yasuhara has a mermaid named Tetty.
Mermaid Melody Pichi Pichi Pitch - A manga about a group of mermaid princesses who become pop singers and use their voices as weapons against their enemies.
Mermaid Saga - A manga series by Rumiko Takahashi, which tells that when a person eats the flesh of a mermaid, he can gain immortality, but chances are that the mermaid's flesh will either kill him or transform him into a horrible creatures called "Deformed Ones". Two types of mermaids are shown in the manga. The first may gain human appearance when they eat the flesh of an immortal girl and take on her youthful looks; the second has two legs and feed on the flesh of mermaids who live in water, specifically when they are about to give birth. Besides the flesh, a mermaid's blood, ashes, and liver have different negative effects on humans. Mermaid's blood can sustain a person's youth, but it can't stop their insides from aging, therefore partially tuning them into a Deformed One. Ashes can give flowers immortality, but can only revive dead humans temporarily. A mermaid's liver was used to revive a dead girl, but gave her a need to feed on the livers of living things.
The manga Monster Musume features a mermaid named Meroune Lorelei, often referred to simply as "Mero", as a major character. She is from a noble family and has an obsession with the classic fairy tale "The Little Mermaid". As a result, she desires a tragic romance.
My Bride Is a Mermaid - In this manga, the main character, Nagasumi Michishio is saved from drowning by a mermaid, Sun Seto. Afterward, Nagasumi is forced to marry Sun.
Namor the Sub-Mariner debuted in 1939 as the first superhero of the Marvel Universe. He was born of Homo mermanus, a race of aquatic humanoids. Namor's father was human however, giving him attributes of both races. He is able to exist both on land and at sea, possesses superhuman strength, and can fly via the winglike fins on his ankles. A prince of the undersea kingdom of Atlantis, he would later ascend to the throne as its king. He has a history of hostility towards human civilization but has also been a tenuous ally.
One Piece - The manga and anime series has many mermaids, most notably Kokoro, Camie and Princess Shirahoshi.
Rave Master - The character Celia is a beautiful young mermaid with long blue hair. She is the younger sister of the Queen of the underwater mermaid village, Mildesta. She falls deeply in love with the main protagonist, Haru Glory.
Starstruck -  The character Eeeeeeeeeeluh, a psychic fish woman, has appeared in various incarnations of the science fiction comic series Starstruck, by Elaine Lee and Michael Wm. Kaluta: in the stage play, the comic book stories, a print portfolio, and posters.
Superman - The comic book superhero Superman had a romantic love interest with a mermaid named Lori Lemaris. Her first appearance was in 1959. The name Lori Lemaris was probably drawn from Lorelei rock in the Rhine added to maris, from the Latin mare, meaning ocean. She has the initials L.L., the same as several of Superman's other love interests including Lois Lane and Lana Lang.
Urusei Yatsura - In chapter 125, "Pool Spooks! Burning with Forbidden Love", Lum decides to help and with Shinobu's help, they dress as two mermaids.

Films

{| class="wikitable sortable"
! width=20% |Film !! Year !! Notes
|-
| The Mermaid || 1904 || Silent film by Georges Méliès and starring an unknown actress as The Mermaid.  This whimsical, four-minute-long film is the first to feature mermaids.
|-
| Siren of the Sea (or The Mermaid) || 1911 || Silent film starring Annette Kellerman as the first mermaid to actually swim in a costume tail in a film. 
|-
| Neptune's Daughter || 1914 || Starring Annette Kellerman.
|-
| A Daughter of the Gods || 1916 || Starring Annette Kellerman.
|-
| Queen of the Sea  || 1918 || Starring Annette Kellerman.
|-
| Venus of the South Seas || 1924 || Starring Annette Kellerman.
|-
| King Neptune || 1932 || King Neptune and an array of sea creatures come to the rescue of a mermaid captured by lecherous pirates in this Walt Disney Silly Symphonies cartoon.
|-
| Ikan Doejoeng || 1941 || From the Dutch East Indies
|-
| Miranda || 1948 || Starring Glynis Johns
|-
| Mr. Peabody and the Mermaid || 1948 || Starring Ann Blyth
|-
| Million Dollar Mermaid || 1952|| Based on the life of Annette Kellerman.
|-
| Peter Pan || 1953 ||Produced by Walt Disney and released by RKO Radio Pictures. The mermaids have a minor role in the film, as they live in the mermaid lagoon. The mischievous mermaids enjoy tormenting Wendy, but flee at the sight of Captain Hook.
|-
| Mad About Men || 1954 || Sequel to Miranda (1948).
|-
| Pekka ja Pätkä sammakkomiehinä (Pekka and Pätkä as Frogmen) || 1954 || In this Finnish Pekka Puupää comedy, the heroes rescue a foundered mermaid and carry her to Pekka's apartment. They set her on the bathtub. Pekka's wife Justiina initially sees only her fish-tail and is initially surprised by "a big fish the menfolks have caught" and gets a knife to prepare it as a dinner, but she faints as she sees the mermaid's upper body.
|-
| Night Tide || 1961 || Starring Dennis Hopper and Linda Lawson
|-
| The Mermaids of Tiburon || 1962 || Starring Diane Webber, George Rowe, and Timothy Carey
|-
| Beach Blanket Bingo || 1965 ||  Starring Frankie Avalon and Annette Funicello, and includes a sub-plot of the character Bonehead (Jody McCrea) falling for a mermaid portrayed by Lost in Space'''s Marta Kristen.
|-
| Head || 1968 || Starring The Monkees, briefly features two mermaids in the opening "Porpoise Song" sequence, surrounded by psychedelic effects.
|-
| Siren || 1968 || Animated short film
|-
| Local Hero || 1984 || Marine researcher Marina (Jenny Seagrove) is suspected by her love interest of being a mermaid.
|-
| Splash || 1984 || Starring Daryl Hannah and Tom Hanks, Hannah plays a mermaid who falls in love with a human. She can walk on dry land when in human form, but her legs change into a fish tail whenever she gets wet. Much of the movie revolves around her humorous attempts to conceal her true identity from her lover. A made-for-television sequel, Splash, Too followed in 1988, starring Amy Yasbeck and Todd Waring.
|-
| Talk Dirty To Me Part III || 1984 || The third and fourth films in the adult film series Talk Dirty To Me feature mermaids who come ashore to find men. As in Splash, the mermaids can walk on dry land, and their legs become tails in water. The film endured controversy when it became public knowledge in 1986 that, at the time of filming, actress Traci Lords was 16-year-old and, therefore, underage in the US.
|-
| Mermaid in the Manhole || 1988 || A Tokyo-based shock film centered around a decaying mermaid found living in the Tokyo sewer system. This is a very gruesome film; it focuses on the mermaid's decay and subsequent death from exposure to toxic environment of the sewer.
|-
| The Little Mermaid || 1989 || Produced by Walt Disney Studios, this film portrays a variant of the story by Hans Christian Andersen about Ariel, the mermaid princess who wished for legs. This film was followed by a prequel TV series (The Little Mermaid), a direct-to-video sequel titled The Little Mermaid II: Return to the Sea featuring the title character's daughter, and a DTV prequel movie in 2008 titled The Little Mermaid: Ariel's Beginning.
|-
| Hook || 1991 || Produced by TriStar Pictures Amblin Entertainment, three mermaids appear when Peter Pan (Robin Williams) is dropped into the ocean in Neverland.
|-
| The Secret of Roan Inish || 1994 || Incorporates mysticism into the selkies and their fae children.
|-
| Mermaid Got Married || 1994 || This Hong Kong romantic-comedy (based on Splash) tells the story of a school teacher who falls in love with a mermaid who'd rescued him as a young boy. The film stars Asian cinema idols Ekin Cheng, Christy Chung, and Takeshi Kaneshiro.
|-
| Magic Island || 1995 || Lily, a young mermaid, befriends a group of buccaneers and joins them on their quest for Blackbeard's treasure.
|-
| Sabrina Down Under || 1999 || Sabrina (Melissa Joan Hart) travels to Australia's Great Barrier Reef with her best friend Gwen, a fellow witch from England, for a week-long vacation where they try to help protect a hidden mermaid colony whose habitat is threatened by ocean pollution, and by a local marine biologist, Dr. Julian Martin. 
|-
| The Thirteenth Year || 1999 || A teen learns that his birth mother is a mermaid after he begins to grow fins and slimy scales on his thirteenth birthday.
|-
| She Creature || 2001 || Circa 1900, a carnival barker named Angus discovers a mermaid held captive in a tank by a disturbed old man. Angus steals the mermaid and loads her on a ship headed for America. When the mermaid is discovered, Angus's lover Lily begins to suspect that the mermaid is more dangerous than she first seemed.
|-
| Mermaids || 2003 || Erika Heynatz, Nikita Ager, and Sarah Laine are a trio of mermaids who solve their father's murder.
|-
| Peter Pan || 2003 || Mermaids appear in a small segment: the narrator says they "are not like the mermaids in stories" though Wendy is thrilled by them. These mermaids have webbed fingers and markings on their faces. Peter asks them if Captain Hook has kidnapped John and Michael, which the mermaids confirm. One of them also tries to drown Wendy.
|-
| Sirène song || 2005 || Short feature by Fanny Jean-Noel. A mermaid is seeking for a job.
|-
| The Lion, the Witch and the Wardrobe || 2005 || Mermaids appear briefly at the end of the story.
|-
| Harry Potter and the Goblet of Fire || 2005 || Merpeople appear briefly during the second task.
|-
| Barbie Fairytopia: Mermaidia || 2006 || In this Barbie doll direct-to-video movie, Elina travels to Mermaidia to save her friend Nalu, the merman prince, who has been kidnapped by the evil Laverna. It's up to Elina to stop them with the help of Nori, a headstrong mermaid who does not trust outsiders.
|-
| Aquamarine || 2006 || The title character is a mermaid (Sara Paxton) who is washed ashore after a violent storm. She decides to search for true love on land, and makes two good human friends (Joanna "JoJo" Levesque and Emma Roberts) along the way.
|-
| Legend of Sudsakorn || 2006 || The main character, Charlie Trairat, is the son of a mermaid who is sent on a magical quest to find his father, a prince. 
|-
| Princess ||2008|| Starring Shileen Paton as a mermaid named Cala who lives under the pond.
|-
| Ponyo ||2008||Japanese film directed by creator Hayao Miyazaki about a goldfish who wants to become a human girl due to her relationship with a young boy.
|-
| Bedtime Stories ||2008|| A mermaid appears in the book that Skeeter gives to Bobbi and Patrick.
|-
| Hoshisuna no Shima no Chiisana Tenshi (Mermaid Smile) ||2010|| Japanese film starring D-Boys members Tetsuya Makita and Masashi Mikami, and Riho Iida of Love Live! fame. The story is of a girl who is found washed up on the shore in a tourist area of Okinawa, and suspected of being a mermaid.
|-
| Barbie in A Mermaid Tale ||2010|| In this Barbie doll direct-to-video movie, Barbie stars as Merliah, a surfing champion from Malibu. One minute she's a normal teenager and the next she learns a shocking family secret: she's a mermaid! Merliah and her dolphin friend Zuma set off on an undersea adventure to rescue her mother, the queen of Oceana.
|-
| Empires of the Deep ||2011|| A human falls in love with a mermaid in a fantasy world.
|-
| Pirates of the Caribbean: On Stranger Tides ||2011|| During his search for the Fountain of Youth, Jack Sparrow encounters several mermaids.
|-
|Barbie in A Mermaid Tale 2 ||2012|| In this Barbie doll direct-to-video movie sequel, Merliah heads to Australia for the ultimate surfing competition. When the evil mermaid Eris escapes from her whirlpool, thanks to Kylie Morgan who steals Merliah's necklace, with plans to take Callissa's spot on the throne of Aquellia and get the power of Merilia, Merliah and her sea friends dive in to stop her.
|-
|Ice Age: Continental Drift ||2012||In the cases of Sid the Sloth and Captain Gutt, the fishlike creatures called sirens shapeshift into a mermaid-themed sloth (mersloth) and a mermaid-themed ape (merape) and near the end of the film, the latter traumatizes the tyrant ape by eating him.
|-
|Barbie: The Pearl Princess ||2014|| In this Barbie doll direct-to-video movie Barbie stars as Lumina, a mermaid who dreams of being a princess. Lumina and her best friend Kuda, a pink seahorse, embark on an adventure to a majestic mer-kingdom. There, she discovers that her magic is the key to unlocking her true destiny and ultimately saving the kingdom.
|-
|Maidens of the Sea ||2014|| The second feature film by writer/director Kerri Kuchta, this film tells the story of a lonely sailor who discovers an island of mermaids.
|-
|Killer Mermaid ||2014|| Horror film directed by Milan Todorovic
|-
|The Lure ||2015|| Polish horror-musical film directed by Agnieszka Smoczyńska which chronicles two carnivorous mermaids who begin working as nightclub performers in 1980s Warsaw.
|-
|The Mermaid||2016||Chinese film starred by Lin Yun and directed by the Hong Kong comedian Stephen Chow.
|-
|The Legend of Sarila||2013||Features a mermaid-like goddess named Sedna.
|-
|Small Fry||2011||Part of the Toy Story Toons short animations. Buzz Lightyear meets a plastic mermaid named Neptuna who always carries her trident and sits on a rock.
|-
|My Fairy Tail Love Story||2018||A girl finds a rock while diving and becomes a mermaid.
|-
|The Lighthouse||2019||Several parts of the movie involve Winslow having visions of a mermaid, including having sexual intercourse with it.
|-
|Onward||2020||Mermaids in this film are portrayed to have ears that look like fish fins in addition to their fishlike tails. In the trailer, one of the mermaids is shown relaxing in an inflatable pool.
|}

Music

Mermaids have long been associated with music, and much like that of Orpheus, the power of their singing voices is said to have had the ability to enthrall. Along with their legendary vanity, the hair-combing and mirrors, the association of mermaids with music is coupled with another association of a vocal nature: they are said to be able to confer verbal eloquence, much like the Muses of the ancient Greek myths.
In the 18th-century sea shanty, "The Keeper of the Eddystone Light", the singer's father is a lighthouse keeper and his mother is a mermaid.
Alexander von Zemlinsky's symphonic poem Die Seejungfrau (The Mermaid), first performed in 1905 but then forgotten until its second performance in 1984, is based on Andersen's detailed fairy story. Zemlinsky briefly explained its plan to Arnold Schoenberg; a more detailed matching of story and music is provided by its second conductor, Peter Gülke.
1985 hit by French duo Les Rita Mitsouko, "Marcia Baila", includes the verse "...la sirène en mal d'amour" (A lovesick mermaid). The song's video clip includes a mermaid.
In Finnish musician J. Karjalainen's song Merenneito ja minä ("Mermaid and Me"), he describes a wonderful tour in the underwater kingdom with a mermaid with whom he has fallen in love. In the song he is able to breathe under water due to the mermaid's magic medicine.
Another Finnish song, Koskenlaskijan morsiamet ("Brides of Log Driver") is about a mermaid who falls in love with a skillful log driver. Unfortunately, he is already engaged to a human woman. When the mermaid sees her love riding the rapids with his human bride, she in a burst of jealousy raises a rock off the river bed, drowning them both. Seeing them drown and die, she immediately regrets her deed, and in the end of the song she is left weeping alone on the rock.
Joanna Newsom's song "Colleen" tells the story of a girl from the sea who adapts to life on land, but is plagued by dreams and memories of her past. The song is told from the girl's perspective, and it is left open to interpretation whether or not she eventually returns.
The music video for "Cherish" by Madonna includes several merman and a merman child.
Another Madonna music video, Music had an animated Madonna turn into a mermaid while diving into a martini.
In the music video for "Mermaid Sashimi" by Mexican singer Juan Son, a mermaid is in a restaurant ready for being cooked.
The mermaiding performers of Weeki Wachee Springs appear in the 2005 music video for the track Low C by Supergrass.
 The Weeki Wachee Mermaids also briefly appear in the music video for the 2012 Kelly Clarkson song, Stronger (What Doesn't Kill You).
The death metal virtual band Dethklok have a song called "Murmaider," about mermaid murder. In the second episode of the animated series Metalocalypse, the band state that fish had "no good metals to listens to" so they recorded The DethWater Album. "Murmaider" appeared as the first track of the band's real album, The Dethalbum.
Sade appears as a lovestruck mermaid in the music video for her 1992 single "No Ordinary Love."
Ricky Martin's  music video "She Bangs" it's full of mermaids
Among the outrageous claims made in the Lonely Island song "I'm On A Boat" is the claim by T-Pain that he has had sex with a mermaid. The video shows an African American mermaid in the background behind T-Pain as he sings this verse.
Danish bubblegum singer Ni-Ni (Nynne Qvortrup) released an album in Japan and Denmark on February 16, 2001 called Mermaid which included the song "A Mermaid's Tale."
Tori Amos references a mermaid in her song Silent All These Years. and was inspired by reading Hans Christian Andersen's The Little Mermaid story to her little niece, Cody.
Lady Gaga dressed as a mermaid named Yuyi for the video for "You and I."
Lana Del Rey released a song Mermaid Motel in 2010 on Del Rey's debut album, Lana Del Ray A.K.A. Lizzy Grant.
In 2007, Japanese pop group SMAP recorded a song titled "Mermaid", which was originally intended as a single, but ended up being released as the 7th track of their 2008 Platinum album, Super Modern Artistic Performance. The song was used for Japanese media coverage of select swimming events during the 2008 Summer Olympics.
"FT Nesli - Mermaid" sung by Turkish singer Neslihan Evrüz 2008 in English by Burak Yeter from the album Mermaid.
Andrew Lloyd Webber's Love Never Dies features a mermaid in the musical number "Beautiful/The Beauty Underneath".
In 2011, Japanese group Aldious released a single, "Mermaid". The PV had one of the girls of the band as a mermaid.
In 2011, Finnish symphonic power metal band Nightwish released Imaginaerum, which contained the song "Turn Loose the Mermaids".
In 2012, French singer Nolwenn Leroy appeared as a mermaid on the cover of her album Ô Filles De L'Eau, and in the music video of her single "Sixième Continent."
In 2012, American pop rock band Train released a new single titled "Mermaid" from their sixth studio album, California 37.
The music videos for the Maroon 5 songs "What Lovers Do" (2017) with musician SZA, "Wait" (2018) with swimming team Aqualillies and "Lost" (2021) with model Behati Prinsloo as mermaids are looking on the band's frontman Adam Levine.
The opera The Enchanted Island features mermaids in the end.
The music video for the 2016 Twice song, "TT (song)" Chaeyoung is The Little Mermaid
The music video for the 2018 song “Only You” by Cheat Codes ft. Little Mix features an LGBT narrative with a mermaid and a lonely girl.
The 2020 humoristic song "Aquamann" by German satirical musician "King Krümel" features refrain Singer "Zirena" as mermaid.
In the 2021 music video, "In the Morning" by Jennifer Lopez who transform into a mermaid.

Television

 Many comedy series, such as Family Guy and Robot Chicken, satire mermaids' inability to reproduce without genitalia.
 In the Japanese tokusatsu television subgenre (and its Americanized counterpart), there are a few mermaid-based elements:
 Dengeki Sentai Changeman (1985) is the design theme for the heroes of which was mythological creatures – Sayaka Nagisa (Hiroko Nishimoto) transformed into a white-colored ranger called Change Mermaid. Some of her attacks were based on underwater movement.
 The short film Hikari Sentai Maskman (1987) features a mermaid named Lelai, who is tricked into using her beautiful singing voice to create earthquakes that would destroy the world.
 In Power Rangers: Lightspeed Rescue (2000), Blue Ranger Chad Lee befriends and falls in love with a mermaid named Marina (Kamera Walton). She appears in only two episodes, "Ocean Blue" and "Neptune's Daughter"; the second time forced to lure the Lightspeed Rangers into a trap. (No mermaid appeared in the previous original 1999 Japanese series, Kyuukyuu Sentai GoGo-V.)
 Mahou Sentai MagiRanger (2005) - Urara Ozu (Asami Kai) harnessed the power of the water Heavenly Saint Splagel, who is a mermaid; thus, Urara's MagiMajin form is MagiMermaid (whose legs can merge to allow her to swim underwater). However, when she upgrades halfway through the series into her Legend form, her body joins with her two older brothers and younger sister to form the Legendary Majuu MagiLion. Then in Power Rangers: Mystic Force which aired the following year, Madison Rocca (Melanie Vallejo) is the Blue Mystic Force Ranger. She draws her powers from an ancient titan who was shaped as a mermaid.  Since the giant monster battle footage from PRMystic Force is taken directly from MagiRanger, Madison's giant Mystic Mermaid form mirrors that of Urara's MagiMermaid.
 Madison's name is perhaps an intentional pun and tip of the hat since that was the name of the mermaid character played by Daryl Hannah in the 1984 film Splash.
• In the 1973-1974 anime ‘Cutie Honey’, one of Honey Kisaragi's transformations is a mermaid, which she uses to survive harsh weather conditions at sea.

Video games
Aquaria – Players control the mermaid-like character Naija.
Ariel and other characters from Disney's The Little Mermaid appear as supporting characters in the Kingdom Hearts video game series, a crossover between various Disney franchises and Square Enix's Final Fantasy franchise. Attina and Andrina, two of Ariel's mermaid sisters, make cameos in Kingdom Hearts II during its final musical number.
One of the many bosses from Cuphead is Cala Maria, a gigantic mermaid who has a lot of sea creatures fighting by her side.
Donkey Kong 64 – There is a blondheaded blue mermaid princess (with a silver tiara on her head) who lives in her seashell home at Gloomy Galleon and needs 5 pearls, so Tiny Kong is tasked to go small and retrieve the pearls for her so she can give her the Golden Banana.
Double Dealing Character – In the fourteenth title of the Touhou Project series, a mermaid named Wakasagihime serves as the game's first boss. She has the ability to increase her strength when in water.
Eliza was a second boss from Gokujo Parodius, made a cameo in Sexy Parodius in Stage 2, which a Pachinko of CR Gokujo Parodius, and Otomedius in Stage 1, voiced by Hitomi Nabatame.
Feeding Frenzy and Feeding Frenzy 2 – A mermaid gives starfish for bonus points after successful levels.
The Goonies II – The climax of the game involves rescuing a mermaid.
Insaniquarium – The puzzle game published by PopCap Games features a mermaid named Meryl who appears as the hostess of the game. She also appears as a pet and her ability is that she sings, which makes the guppies drop more money.
The Legend of Zelda: Link's Awakening – On Koholint Island, there is a mermaid named Martha who lives in a bay.  She states that she has lost her necklace because of the ocean waves. After Link retrieves her necklace, Martha gives him a mermaid scale in return.
The Legend of Zelda: Phantom Hourglass – Link encounters what he at first believes is a real mermaid, but later discovers she is a Hylian girl named Joanne who enjoys dressing up as a mermaid. She is involved in several side quests.
In Nintendo's The Legendary Starfy series, a character named simply "Mermaid" is used to save the game. When the player character, Starfy, bumps into the shell she lives in, the game saves.
Mega Man 9 – Splash Woman's design is based on the appearance of a mermaid.
The Pokémon Primarina, a Water/Fairy-type, is based on both a mermaid and a sea lion.
In the game No Straight Roads, Sayu, the second member of the Megastars, is a mermaid and a virtual pop idol. The heroes Zuke and Mayday battle her in Akusuka, the district of Vinyl City under her control.
Puyo Puyo – The Japanese puzzle game series from Compile (later owned by Sega) features a mermaid named Serilly (Seriri in Japan) who believes that everyone is trying to eat her, due to the belief that eating mermaid flesh will grant immortality.
The mobile game Puyopuyo!! Quest features five additional mermaids as part of the Tropical Merfolk series in the game.
Return of the Obra Dinn – This mystery game incorporates many naval myths of the 18th/19th century, including the myth of mermaids.
Mermaids appear in Shantae games like Shantae and the Pirate's Curse and Shantae: Half-Genie Hero.
Mermaids are a new "life state" introduced in The Sims 3: Island Paradise and The Sims 4: Island Living.
The Marai creatures from the League of Legends lore, featuring Nami.

Professional wrestling
In 2013, while signed to Total Nonstop Action Wrestling (now Impact Wrestling), female wrestler SoCal Val did a photoshoot in costume as Disney's Ariel.

See also
 Fiji mermaid
 Goddess of the Sea (Visbal), sculpture
 Lorelei
 Sea monk
 Sirenia

References